The 11th Mirchi Music Awards, presented by Indian FM radio station Radio Mirchi, honoured the best music professionals of Hindi language Indian films of 2018. The ceremony was held at the Dome at the National Sports Club of India, Mumbai on 16 February 2019 and was hosted by Indian singer and actor Sonu Nigam. The event included live music performances by Badshah, Neha Kakkar, Meet Bros, Jonita Gandhi, Arko, Papon, Shivam Pathak, and Ashmik Patil, the winner of the Smule Mirchi Cover Star. A new award category, "Recreated Song of the Year," was introduced to recognize the many ‘re-creations’ released in 2018. Padmaavat won several awards including Album of the Year and Song of the Year for "Ghoomar." The show was broadcast on 17 March 2019 on Zee TV.

Winners and nominees 
The winners were selected by the members of the jury, chaired by Kavita Krishnamurthy. The following table lists the names of nominees and winners.

(Winners are listed first, highlighted in boldface.)

Film awards

Technical awards

Listeners' Choice awards

Non-film awards

Special awards

Jury awards

Films with multiple wins and nominations

Jury 

The jury was chaired by Kavita Krishnamurthy and included the following:

 Milind Srivastava - music director
 Anuradha Paudwal - playback singer
 Dharmesh Darshan - director and writer
 Hariharan - singer
 Ila Arun - actress and folk singer
 Irshad Kamil - lyricist
 Lalit Pandit - composer
 Louis Banks - composer, record producer and singer
 Pankaj Udhas - singer
 Pritam - music director and composer
 Rajkumar Santoshi - director, producer and screenwriter
 Ramesh Sippy - director and producer
 Roop Kumar Rathod - playback singer and music director
 Sadhana Sargam - playback singer
 Sameer - lyricist
 Sapna Mukherjee - playback singer
 Shailendra Singh - playback singer
 Shankar Mahadevan - composer and playback singer
 Shravan Rathod - music director
 Sudesh Bhosle - playback singer
 Suresh Wadkar - playback singer
 Talat Aziz - singer
 Udit Narayan - playback singer
 Vijay Krishna Acharya - director and screenwriter

See also 
 Mirchi Music Awards

References

External links 
 Music Mirchi Awards Official Website
 Music Mirchi Awards 2018

Mirchi Music Awards